Jenny Houston may refer to:

 Jenny Houston (Hollyoaks), a character in Hollyoaks
 Jenny Huston (born 1973), radio and television presenter